Short and Sweet is a 1992 album recorded by the American singer Little Annie (real name Annie Bandez, also known as Annie Anxiety).

The album was produced by Adrian Sherwood for his On-U Sound productions and features members of Tackhead, notably the guitarist Skip McDonald and bassist Doug Wimbish.

The track "Bless Those (Little Annie's Prayer)" was re-recorded by Living Colour on their 2009 album The Chair in the Doorway.

Track listing
All tracks written by Annie Bandez, Bernard Alexander and Doug Wimbish, except where noted.

"Watch The World Go Bye" – 4:35
"Bless Those (Little Annie's Prayer)" (Bandez, Wimbish) – 3:27
"Going For Gold" – 4:28
"I Think Of You" (Bandez, David Harrow, Wimbish) – 4:53
"I Think Of You (Dub)" (Bandez, Harrow, Wimbish) – 2:15
"Give It To Me" – 4:01
"You The Night And The Music" – 3:30
"Little Man" – 4:43
"Prisoner Of Paradise" (Bandez, Adrian Maxwell, Wimbish) – 4:13
"Everything & More" – 4:04 
"If Cain Were Able" (Bandez, Richard Norris) – 6:55

Personnel
Little Annie – vocals
Skip McDonald – instruments
Doug Wimbish – instruments
David Harrow – programming
Somay Askpan – percussion
Technical
Paul Beckett – engineer
Dave Curtis – vocal engineer
Coneyl Jay - artwork, photography
Recorded at RMS Studios, London, England

References

1992 albums
albums produced by Adrian Sherwood
On-U Sound Records albums